Gabe Jennings (born January 25, 1979) is an American Olympian who was one of the United States' premier middle distance runners.  A graduate of Madison (WI) East High School  and Stanford University, he is known for winning the 2000 USA Olympic Trials in the 1500 m with a time of 3:35.90.   In 2003, after a poor 2002 season, Jennings biked from California to Brazil.

Gabe also plays several instruments, including the didgeridoo and the berimbau.

High school

Sophomore year
After growing up in northern California, Gabe Jennings and his family moved to Madison, Wisconsin, where Gabe enrolled in Madison East High School.   In the fall of 1994, Gabe qualified for the WIAA Division 1 State Cross Country Championships and placed eighth overall.  In the spring of 1995, he won State titles in both the 1600 meters (4:15.6) and the 3200 meters (9:15.7).

Junior year
Jennings won the 1995 WIAA State Cross Country title.  He also qualified for the Foot Locker Cross Country Championships, where he placed seventh overall with a time of 15:29.  In track, he won the Penn Relays high school 1500 meter title in 3:50.84.  At the 1996 WIAA State Track & Field Championships, he won three individual distance events: 800 meter (1:54.4), 1600 meter (4:12.1) and 3200 meter.

Senior year
As a senior, Jennings again won the individual state title in cross country.  He also qualified for the Foot Locker Cross Country Championships again, and as the second-h

highest returning athl,ehe te was one of the favorites for the title.  However, a side ache limited Gabe to a 27th place finish among the 32 runners.

During the track & field season, Gabe once again won the Penn Relays high school 1500 meter title with a time of 3:45.98.  Rather than once again attempt the distance triple at the WIAA State Track & Field Championships, Gabe sacrificed the open 3200 meter to run with his teammates in the 4x800 meter Relay.  He split a 1:50.7 to move Madison East into fifth place with an overall time of 7:59.35.  Jenning then won the 1600 meter with a time of 4:04.97, claiming the State record, and the 800 meter with a time of 1:52.18 to finish his high school career with nine State titles.  A few weeks later at the Prefontaine Classic in Eugene, Oregon, Gabe ran a Mile time of 4:02.81, the fastest prep Mile in 23 years.  He still has the fastest 1500 meter, 1600 meter and Mile times in Wisconsin prep history, along with the seventh best time in the 800 meter.

College

Freshman year
Gabe was part of an unbelievable freshman class of milers at Stanford that also included future Olympian Jonathon Riley.  With a powerhouse cross country team returning (Stanford was the defending NCAA champ), the Cardinal redshirted Gabe.  He did, however, carry on one Stanford tradition:  winning the US Junior National Cross Country Championships (marking the fourth year in a row it was won by an athlete from Stanford).  A team made up of Stanford athletes called the Cardinal Harriers easily took the team title with just 19 points.

Stanford did not redshirt Gabe for the Track & Field season.  By any standard, Gabe had a very successful freshman campaign, finishing as the top freshman in the nation in the 800 meter, 1500 meter and 3000 meter.  The only freshman ranked ahead of him in the 5000 meter was his own teammate, Jonathon Riley.  He ran the second fastest 3000 meter time (7:58.40) ever by an American Junior, and he was the first American Junior to break 4:00 in the mile in over 12 years.  On the NCAA level, he was just as successful, earning Indoor All-American honors by finishing fourth in the 3000 meter at the NCAA Indoor Track & Field Championships.  A few months later at the NCAA Outdoor Track & Field Championships, Gabe was leaned out at the tape for the win in the 1500 meter final.  In the summer, he won both the 1500 meter and 5000 meter races at the US Junior Track & Field Championships, then placed fifth overall in the 1500 meter at the World Junior Championships. Gabe then took fifth at the US Track & Field Championships in the 800 meter with a personal best of 1:46.99.

Sophomore year
While the cross country season did not go quite as well as predicted, Gabe still won the Cardinal Invitational.  His poor showing at the Pac-10 Championships kept him off the NCAA team.  Stanford, as a team, would end up second behind the University of Arkansas.  Gabe redshirted the indoor season, then, in a surprising move, the Cardinal redshirted both Gabe and powerhouse teammate Michael Stember for the outdoor season.  Stanford fell just seven points short of the NCAA Outdoor team title, which made the move to redshirt Stember and Jennings so puzzling, especially when the two placed 4-5, respectively, at the US Outdoor Track & Field Championships in the 1500 meter.  Gabe was able to get some international experience by competing in races over in Europe.

Junior year
Gabe started his cross country season on top by winning the BYU Invitational, which Stanford won easily.  He finished 18th at the Stanford Invitational and 48th at Pre-Nationals while Stanford again won both team titles.  The Cardinal suffered their first defeat of the season at the hands of Arizona at the Pac-10 Championships, where Gabe finished 20th overall.  Running perhaps his best race of the year, Gabe finished fourth at the NCAA West Regional to lead Stanford to the team title.  His luck (and his team's luck) did not continue at the NCAA Championships, where Gabe placed 123rd overall and Stanford managed a fourth place finish.

The 2000 track & field season was a breakout one for Gabe Jennings.  He ran the lead-off 1200 meter leg of Stanford's Distance Medley Relay that won the NCAA Indoor championship and set a new indoor World Record with a time of 9:28.83.  The next day, he also won the mile (3:59.46) while his teammate Michael Stember finished second.  Jennings came back a few hours later to place seventh in the 3000 meter (8:04.96) to earn his third All-American plaque of the meet.  Stanford finished second overall as a team (for the third consecutive year).  Outdoors, Gabe and Stember again finished 1-2 at the NCAA Championships, this time in the 1500 meter.  It was Gabe's third NCAA title of the year, but more importantly, Stanford won the overall team title (its first in 66 years).

Despite his success during the year, Gabe was only considered a mild threat to make the United States Olympic team in the 1500 meter.  The prohibitive favorites at the Trials were previous Olympians like Paul McMullen and Steve Holman.  Gabe and his teammate, Michael Stember, made some noise by finishing 1-2 in their qualifying heat to make the finals.  After jostling around with the pack for the first two laps of the final, Gabe made a big move and shot out to almost a 30 meter lead.  He kept chugging and crossed the line first in a new personal best of 3:35.90 to qualify for the Olympic team.  Stember was no better than sixth with 100 meters to go, but held his form and finished third in a personal best of 3:37.04.  While Gabe's time qualified him for the Olympics, Stember's did not, so he had to chase the time all summer, finally achieving it in his final attempt.  At the Olympics, Gabe finished sixth in his preliminary heat to advance to the semifinals.  But his Olympic dream would end in the semis when he got outkicked for a spot in the finals.

Personal bests
 800 meters – 1:46.99
 1500 meters – 3:35.21
 Mile – 3:58.25
 3000 meters – 7:58.40
 5000 meters – 13:44.60

References

External links
 USATF athlete bio
 Wisconsin Track & Field bio
 Stanford bio
 Track and Field News
 Flotrack Videos with Gabe Jennings (video interview)

1979 births
Living people
American male middle-distance runners
Athletes (track and field) at the 2000 Summer Olympics
Olympic track and field athletes of the United States
Stanford Cardinal men's track and field athletes
Madison East High School alumni
20th-century American people